Thomas Joseph Daley (born February 20, 1943) is a Canadian former ice hockey goaltender. He played in the National Hockey League and World Hockey Association for the Pittsburgh Penguins, Buffalo Sabres, Detroit Red Wings, and Winnipeg Jets between 1968 and 1979.

Career 
Daley was the Sabres' first choice in the 1970 Intra-League Draft. He was also one of the last NHL goalies to play without a mask, although he did wear a mask for Winnipeg in the WHA.

Daley's longest stint in major league hockey was with Winnipeg from 1972–79. He won three league championships with the Jets (1975-76, 1977-78 and 1978–79) and was the WHA's second leading goalie during the 1975–76 season. In 1981–82, he was the coach of the junior hockey Penticton Knights. He later operated a trading card store in Winnipeg, named Joe Daley's Sports and Framing.

Career statistics

Regular season and playoffs

Awards and achievements 
SJHL Second All-Star Team (1962)
EHL Rookie of the Year (1964)
Avco Cup (WHA) Championship (1976, 1978, & 1979)
WHA First All-Star Team (1976)
Izvetia Cup Best Goaltender (1976)
WHA Second All-Star Team (1977)
"Honoured Member" of the Manitoba Hockey Hall of Fame
Inducted as an inaugural member into the World Hockey Association Hall of Fame (2010)
Inducted into the Manitoba Sports Hall of Fame 2018
All Time Leader in WHA wins by a goaltender

References

External links 
 

1943 births
Living people
Baltimore Clippers players
Buffalo Sabres players
Canadian ice hockey goaltenders
Cincinnati Wings players
Detroit Red Wings players
Johnstown Jets players
Memphis Wings players
Pittsburgh Hornets players
Pittsburgh Penguins players
San Francisco Seals (ice hockey) players
Ice hockey people from Winnipeg
Sudbury Wolves (EPHL) players
Winnipeg Jets (WHA) players